Brian Dunsford (born 26 September 1936) is a former Australian rules footballer who played with Melbourne in the Victorian Football League (VFL).

Notes

External links 

1936 births
Australian rules footballers from Victoria (Australia)
Melbourne Football Club players
Living people